Ciprian Paul Suciu (born 22 January 1987) is a Romanian former footballer who played as a forward.

External links

1987 births
Living people
Sportspeople from Cluj-Napoca
Romanian footballers
Association football forwards
FC Universitatea Cluj players
ACS Sticla Arieșul Turda players
CSU Voința Sibiu players